Latiblattella is a genus of cockroach in the family Ectobiidae.

Species
These 18 species belong to the genus Latiblattella:

 Latiblattella acolhua (Saussure, 1868)
 Latiblattella angustifrons Hebard, 1920
 Latiblattella azteca (Saussure & Zehntner, 1893)
 Latiblattella bradleyi Hebard, 1933
 Latiblattella chichimeca (Saussure & Zehntner, 1893)
 Latiblattella dilatata (Saussure, 1868)
 Latiblattella inornata Hebard, 1920
 Latiblattella kaupiana (Saussure, 1873)
 Latiblattella lucifrons Hebard, 1917 (pale headed cockroach)
 Latiblattella mexicana (Saussure, 1864)
 Latiblattella nitida (Saussure & Zehntner, 1893)
 Latiblattella pavida (Rehn, 1903)
 Latiblattella picturata Hebard, 1921
 Latiblattella rehni Hebard, 1917 (Rehn's cockroach)
 Latiblattella spectativa (Rehn, 1903)
 Latiblattella tarasca (Saussure, 1862)
 Latiblattella vitrea (Brunner von Wattenwyl, 1865)
 Latiblattella zapoteca (Saussure, 1862)

References

Cockroaches
Articles created by Qbugbot